Stencoose is a village in Cornwall, England, United Kingdom, in the parish of St Agnes. It is located north of Redruth, near the village of Mawla.

History
The Haweis family owned a forty or fifty acre estate in the village for many years. By 1824 the main villages, aside from St Agnes, in the St Agnes Parish were Mithian, Stenclose (Stencoose), and Malow (Mawla).

Stencoose underwent archaeological exploration in 1996.

Mining
Nearly a mile east of Stencoose is Wheal Concord, a tin mine. The Stencoose and Mawla United Mine was worked 1860–62.

References

Villages in Cornwall